Niccolò Franco (died 1499) was a Roman Catholic prelate who served as Bishop of Treviso (1485–1499) and Bishop of Poreč (1477–1485).

Biography
In 1477, Niccolò Franco was appointed during the papacy of Pope Sixtus IV as Bishop of Poreč.
On 21 February 1485, he was appointed during the papacy of Pope Innocent VIII as Bishop of Treviso.
He served as Bishop of Treviso until his death in 1499.

References

External links and additional sources
  (for Chronology of Bishops) 
  (for Chronology of Bishops) 
 (for Chronology of Bishops) 
 (for Chronology of Bishops) 

15th-century Italian Roman Catholic bishops
Bishops appointed by Pope Sixtus IV
Bishops appointed by Pope Innocent VIII
1499 deaths